How to Let Go of the World (And Love All the Things Climate Can't Change) is a 2016 environmental documentary by Josh Fox that premiered at the 2016 Sundance Film Festival.

External links

References

2016 documentary films
2016 films
American documentary films
Documentary films about environmental issues
2010s English-language films
2010s American films